Samuel George Harker Philander (born August 25, 1942, Caledon, South Africa) is a climate scientist, known for his work on atmospheric circulation and oceanic currents, particularly El Niño. He is the Knox Taylor Professor emeritus of Geosciences at Princeton University.

Among his published works written for a broad audience are  Our Affair with El Niño: How We Transformed an Enchanting Peruvian Current into a Global Climate Hazard and Is the Temperature Rising?: The Uncertain Science of Global Warming.

Education
Samuel George Philander grew up in South Africa where his family was designated as "Colored" under the system of apartheid.  Based on his end-of-high-school examinations in 1959, he was allowed to take classes at the University of Cape Town, but was still prohibited from extracurricular activities. In 1962 Philander received a B.S. in applied mathematics and physics from the University of Cape Town. 

Philander was awarded a Fulbright grant to study at Harvard University in Cambridge, Massachusetts in the United States. There he studied fluid dynamics and physical oceanography, receiving his Ph.D. in 1970.  His Ph.D. thesis dealt with the Equatorial Undercurrent as a component of global oceanic circulation. He then did postdoctoral work at Massachusetts Institute of Technology,

Career
In 1970, Philander joined the Geophysical Fluid Dynamics Laboratory (GFDL) in Princeton, New Jersey, a research laboratory of the National Oceanic and Atmospheric Administration (NOAA),  He became a senior research oceanographer at GFDL in 1978. 

In 1990, Philander became a professor in the Department of Geosciences at Princeton University. He directed its Atmospheric and Oceanic Sciences (AOS) Program from 1990–2006 and chaired the Department of Geosciences from 1994–2001. In 2005, he received the named chair of Knox Taylor Professor of Geosciences.  In 2017, he became the Knox Taylor Professor of Geosciences, Emeritus.

Research
Philander has studied oceanic circulation, identifying patterns of interaction between ocean and atmosphere that are responsible for the phenomena of El Niño and La Niña and the El Niño–Southern Oscillation. He coined the name "La Niña". His work on Paleoclimatology and his examination of geological data showing past changes to the climate has helped to develop models for the prediction of weather, the impacts of global warming, and global climate change in future.

Selected awards 
 2017, Vetlesen Prize, with Mark Cane
 2010, Fellow, Academy of Science of South Africa
 2007, Fellow, The World Academy of Sciences (TWAS)
 2004, Member, U. S. National Academy of Sciences 
 2003, Member, American Academy of Arts and Sciences 
 1991, Fellow, American Geophysical Union 
 1986, Fellow, American Meteorological Society

Books 
El Niño, La Niña and the Southern Oscillation. 289 pp., Academic Press, 1990.
Is the Temperature Rising? The Uncertain Science of Global Warming. 254 pp., Princeton University Press, 1998.
Our Affair  with  El Niño. How we Transformed an Enchanting Peruvian Current into a Global Climate Hazard. 275 pp., Princeton University Press, 2004.

Selected academic papers 
 
 
Gu D. and  S. G. H.  Philander,  Interdecadal  Climate  Fluctuations  that  depend  on Exchanges between the Tropics and Extratropics, Science, 275, 805–807, 1997.
 
Philander, S. G. H., Instabilities of Zonal Equatorial Currents, 2, J. Geophys.Res., 83(C7), 3679–3682, 1978.
Philander, S. G. H., Instabilities of Zonal Equatorial Currents, J. Geophys. Res., 81(21), 3721–3725, 1976.
Philander, S. G. H., The Equatorial Undercurrent:  Measurements and Theories,   Rev. Geophys. and Space Physics, 11(3), 513–570, 1973.
Philander, S. G. H., The Equatorial Dynamics of a Deep Homogeneous Ocean, Geophys. Fluid Dynamics Journal, 3, 105–123, 1972
Philander, S. G. H., The Equatorial Dynamics of a Shallow Homogeneous Ocean, Geophys. Fluid Dynamics Journal, 2, 219–245, 1971.

References 

South African climatologists
1942 births
Living people
Princeton University faculty
Harvard University alumni
University of Cape Town alumni